The 2012 Aaron's 499 was a NASCAR Sprint Cup Series stock car race held on May 6, 2012 at Talladega Superspeedway in Talladega, Alabama. Contested over 194 laps (with a green-white-checkered finish), it was the tenth race of the 2012 season. Brad Keselowski of Penske Racing took his second win of the season, while Kyle Busch finished second and Matt Kenseth finished third.

There were five cautions and thirty-five lead changes among nineteen different drivers throughout the course of the race. The result moved Keselowski into the twelfth position in the Drivers' Championship. He remained seventy-nine points behind of first place driver Greg Biffle and thirteen ahead of thirteen placed Ryan Newman. Chevrolet maintained its lead in the Manufacturers' Championship, five points ahead of Toyota and ten ahead of Ford, with twenty-six races remaining in the season.

Report

Background

The track, Talladega Superspeedway, is one of six  superspeedways to hold NASCAR races, the others being Daytona International Speedway, Auto Club Speedway, Indianapolis Motor Speedway, Pocono Raceway and Michigan International Speedway. The track's turns are banked at thirty-three degrees, while the front stretch, the location of the finish line, is banked at 16.5 degrees. The back stretch has a two-degree banking. Talladega Superspeedway can seat up to 143,231 people.

Before the race, Greg Biffle led the Drivers' Championship with 338 points, and Dale Earnhardt Jr. stood in second with 333. Denny Hamlin was third in the Drivers' Championship with 329 points, one ahead of Matt Kenseth and thirteen ahead of Martin Truex Jr. in fourth and fifth. Jimmie Johnson with 314 was one ahead of Kevin Harvick, as Tony Stewart with 307 points, was twenty points ahead of Carl Edwards, and twenty-nine in front of Ryan Newman. In the Manufacturers' Championship, Chevrolet was leading with 60 points, eight ahead of Toyota. Ford, with 49 points, was twelve points ahead of Dodge in the battle for third. Johnson was the race's defending race winner after winning it in 2011.

Practice and qualifying

Two practice sessions were held before the race on Friday. The first session was 45 minutes long, while the second lasted 60 minutes.  Aric Almirola was quickest with a time of 48.079 seconds in the first session, two-tenths of a second faster than Michael Waltrip. Kenseth was third, followed by Jeff Gordon, Harvick, and Brad Keselowski. Casey Mears was seventh, still within half of a second of Almirola's time. In the second practice session, Almirola remained quickest with a time of 48.677. Kenseth followed Almirola in the second position with a time of 48.687 seconds, 0.010 seconds slower. Biffle was third quickest, ahead of Hamlin, Regan Smith, and David Gilliland. Joey Logano followed in the seventh position with a time of 49.078 seconds.

Forty-four cars were entered for qualifying, but only forty-three would race because of NASCAR's qualifying procedure. Gordon clinched the seventy-first pole position of his career with a time of 49.973 seconds, the only qualifying lap under 50 seconds. Gordon qualified differently from most of the other drivers, hoping to keep his engine cool through the qualifying laps. A. J. Allmendinger qualified 0.135 seconds behind and joined Gordon on the front row of the grid. Marcos Ambrose took third place, ahead of Almirola and Kahne in the fourth and fifth positions. Championship leader, Biffle qualified sixth, while Edwards followed in seventh. Stewart, Waltrip and Kenseth completed the first ten positions. J. J. Yeley failed to qualify for the race after positing a time of 51.402 seconds.

Following the qualifying session, Gordon stated, "That's quite an accomplishment. I'm just so proud of this DuPont Chevy team. We needed something to boost our morale and something positive because we've had a rough year so far. This is a surprise. We did not expect to be sitting here now talking to you about a pole, and I think it's ironice that we've got the DuPont paint scheme, which is celebrating 20 years and then we win a pole for the 20th straight year."

Race
The race, the tenth in the season, started 2:05 p.m. EDT and was televised live in the United States on Fox. The conditions on the grid were wet before the race and overcast skies are expected. Rain showers before the scheduled start time of 1 p.m. EDT delayed the event by 45 minutes to 2:05 p.m. EDT.

At the drop of the green flag on lap 1, polesitter Jeff Gordon maintained his lead, but was soon passed on the backstretch by the Richard Petty Motorsports tandem of Marcos Ambrose and Aric Almirola. By the time the field returned to the finish line, Matt Kenseth had shoved Tony Stewart to the lead. Stewart led until lap 16, when the first caution of the day waved after Regan Smith's engine blew. Most of the drivers pitted under the caution, and A. J. Allmendinger was penalized for speeding on pit road. Kenseth led the field at the restart on lap 20. On lap 25, Denny Hamlin pushed Michael Waltrip to the lead. Waltrip continued to lead until lap 46 when he was passed by Jimmie Johnson and Dale Earnhardt Jr. During this time, Newman retired to the garage on lap 44 on a mechanical problem. Waltrip dropped to fourth on lap 48 as he was passed by Kurt Busch.

On lap 52, Matt Kenseth reclaimed the lead, though he reported a vibration in his car five laps later. The field cycled through green flag pit stops from lap 58 to lap 62. On lap 64, Dale Earnhardt Jr. claimed the lead. One lap later, Jimmie Johnson's car returned to the garage for a broken oil pump belt. On lap 67, Kenseth picked up Earnhardt in turn 4. The two cars gained some headway until lap 72, where a scramble for the lead sent Earnhardt back from first place to 19th place in the course of three laps, while Jeff Gordon dropped back from third to tenth place, and Kenseth claimed the lead. On lap 81, Michael Waltrip got alongside Kenseth and dueled him for several laps. On lap 87, Waltrip gave Kasey Kahne a shove to the lead. Kahne retained the lead until lap 94 when Juan Pablo Montoya pulled up alongside him. The two cars maintained the lead until another round of green flag pit stops from lap 99 to 106. Paul Menard momentarily held the lead during the cycle before he pitted.

On lap 106, Greg Biffle took the lead. On lap 111, Kenseth pushed Jeff Burton to the lead alongside Biffle. On lap 120, Kurt Busch claimed the lead. He maintained this lead for two laps, when Biffle pushed Kenseth around Busch. Kenseth retained the lead until lap 136, where Kurt Busch momentarily maintained the lead on the first two turns but was repassed by Kenseth on the back straightaway. At lap 141, Busch and Harvick ran out of fuel. As they coasted down the apron on the back straightaway, the second caution flag was waved for a nine car wreck in turns 3 and 4. It started when Aric Almirola, trying to get back above the yellow line, knocked Dave Blaney into the wall. Several more cars piled in: Landon Cassill, Jeff Gordon, Carl Edwards, Martin Truex Jr., Joey Logano, Juan Pablo Montoya, and Terry Labonte. Kenseth and Marcos Ambrose entered the pits after the caution flag waved and the pit road closed. As a result, they and several other drivers, including Kurt Busch and Bobby Labonte - were moved to the back of the field when the race restarted on lap 150. Paul Menard assumed the lead

Two laps later, Brad Keselowski claimed the lead. On lap 159, Denny Hamlin passed Keselowski for the lead. With help from Kenseth, Casey Mears passed Hamlin three laps later, but was repassed by Hamlin a lap later. On lap 166, Keselowski returned Kenseth to the lead. On lap 175, the third caution was waved after Casey Mears cut a tire and spun in turn 2, also brushing and spinning out Trevor Bayne as he came down the banking.  Denny Hamlin, Michael Waltrip, Clint Bowyer and Jamie McMurray pitted on lap 176. Kenseth led at the restart on lap 179.

On lap 181, the fourth caution waved as Kurt Busch spun out in the tri-oval off of Brad Keselowski's bumper. In a notorious move, Busch drove wrong way back to the pits instead of going around the circuit, but was still scored on the lead lap. On the lap 184 restart, Kenseth continued to maintain the lead. Barely had the cars made it down the straightaway when another wreck happened as drivers shuffled around. The drivers involved in the wreck were Menard, Hamlin, Biffle, Waltrip, Harvick, Burton, Robert Richardson Jr., Stewart, and Logano. While driving back to pit road, the left rear tire on Hamlin's car disintegrated, shredding the fender and a panel onto the track. At the green flag on lap 193, Biffle pushed Kenseth clear to the lead. However, Biffle fell back on the backstretch, allowing Keselowski to take the lead with help from Kyle Busch. Keselowski held off Busch, Kenseth and Biffle to win his second Talladega race.

Results

Qualifying

Race results

Standings after the race

Drivers' Championship standings

Manufacturers' Championship standings

Note: Only the top five positions are included for the driver standings.

References

NASCAR races at Talladega Superspeedway
Aaron's 499
Aaron's 499
Aaron's 499